NASA Astronaut Group 2, also known as the Next Nine and the New Nine, was the second group of astronauts selected by the National Aeronautics and Space Administration (NASA). Their selection was announced on September 17, 1962. The group augmented the Mercury Seven. President John F. Kennedy had announced Project Apollo, on May 25, 1961, with the ambitious goal of putting a man on the Moon by the end of the decade, and more astronauts were required to fly the two-man Gemini spacecraft and three-man Apollo spacecraft then under development. The Mercury Seven had been selected to accomplish the simpler task of orbital flight, but the new challenges of space rendezvous and lunar landing led to the selection of candidates with advanced engineering degrees (for four of the nine) as well as test pilot experience.

The nine astronauts were Neil Armstrong, Frank Borman, Pete Conrad, Jim Lovell, James McDivitt, Elliot See, Tom Stafford, Ed White, and John Young. The Next Nine were the first astronaut group to include civilian test pilots: See had flown for General Electric, and Armstrong had flown the X-15 rocket-powered aircraft for NASA. Six of the nine flew to the Moon (Lovell and Young twice), and Armstrong, Conrad, and Young walked on it as well. Seven of the nine were awarded the Congressional Space Medal of Honor.

Background 

The launch of the Sputnik 1 satellite by the Soviet Union on October 4, 1957, started a Cold War technological and ideological competition with the United States known as the Space Race. The demonstration of American technological inferiority came as a profound shock to the American public. In response to the Sputnik crisis, a new civilian agency, the National Aeronautics and Space Administration (NASA), was created to oversee an American space program. The Space Task Group (STG) at the NASA Langley Research Center in Hampton, Virginia, created an American crewed spaceflight project called Project Mercury. The selection of the first astronauts, known as the "Original Seven" or "Mercury Seven", was announced on April 9, 1959.

By 1961, although it was yet to launch a person into space, the STG was confident that Project Mercury had overcome its initial setbacks, and that the United States had overtaken the Soviet Union as the most advanced nation in space technology. The STG began considering Mercury Mark II, a two-person successor to the Mercury spacecraft. This confidence was shattered on April 12, 1961, when the Soviet Union launched Vostok 1, and cosmonaut Yuri Gagarin became the first person to orbit the Earth. In response, President John F. Kennedy announced a far more ambitious goal on May 25, 1961: to put a man on the Moon by the end of the decade. The effort to land a man on the Moon already had a name: Project Apollo. The two-person Mercury II spacecraft concept was formally announced by the STG head, Robert R. Gilruth, on December 7, 1961, and on January 3, 1962, it was officially named Project Gemini.

On April 18, 1962, NASA formally announced that it was accepting applications for a new group of astronauts who would assist the Mercury astronauts with Project Mercury, and join them in flying Project Gemini missions. It was anticipated that they might go on to command Project Apollo missions. Unlike the selection process for the Mercury Seven, which was carried out in secret, this selection was widely advertised; public announcements and the minimum standards were communicated to aircraft companies, government agencies and the Society of Experimental Test Pilots.

Selection criteria 

The five minimum selection criteria were that an applicant:
 was an experienced test pilot, with 1,500 hours test pilot flying time, who had graduated from a military test pilot school, or had test pilot experience with NASA or the aircraft industry;
 had flown high-performance jet aircraft;
 had earned a degree in engineering or the physical or biological sciences;
 was recommended by their employer.

The criteria differed from those of the Mercury Seven selection in several ways. The Gemini spacecraft was expected to be roomier than the Mercury one, so the height requirement was relaxed slightly. This made Thomas P. Stafford eligible. A college degree was now required, but could be in the biological sciences. Civilian test pilots were now eligible, but the requirement for experience in high-performance jets favored those with recent experience, and fighter pilots over those with multi-engine experience such as Scott Carpenter of the Mercury Seven. The age limit was lowered from 40 to 35 because whereas Mercury was a short-term project, Project Apollo was going to run until the end of the decade at least. The changed selection criteria meant that the selection panel could not simply select another group from the Mercury Seven finalists.

At this time, Jerrie Cobb, a female award-winning pilot, was pressing for women to be allowed to become astronauts. In 1961 she was one of thirteen women known as the Mercury 13 who had passed the same medical evaluation tests given to the Mercury Seven astronauts as part of a USAF project that assessed the capability of women for spaceflight. Although women were not prevented from applying to become NASA astronauts in 1962, the requirement for jet test pilot experience effectively excluded them. NASA Administrator James E. Webb made this point in a statement to the press in spring 1962, adding: "I do not think we shall be anxious to put a woman or any other person of particular race or creed into orbit just for the purpose of putting them there."

Selection process
The U.S. Navy (USN) and U.S. Marine Corps (USMC) submitted the names of all their applicants who met the selection criteria, but the U.S. Air Force (USAF) conducted its own internal selection process, and it only submitted the names of eleven candidates. The Air Force ran them through a brief training course in May 1962 on how to speak and conduct themselves during the NASA selection process. The candidates called it a "charm school". General Curtis LeMay told them:

In all, 253 applications were received by the June 1, 1962, deadline. Neil Armstrong submitted his application a week after the deadline, but Walter C. Williams, the associate director of the Space Task Group, wanted Armstrong for the space program, so he had Richard Day, who acted as secretary of the selection panel, add it to the pile of applications when it arrived. Paul Bikle, the director of the NASA's Flight Research Center, and therefore Armstrong's boss, declined to recommend Armstrong for astronaut selection because he had misgivings about his performance.

The three-person selection panel consisted of Mercury Seven astronauts Alan Shepard and Deke Slayton, and NASA test pilot Warren J. North, although Williams sat in on some sessions. They reduced the candidates to 32 finalists, from whom they hoped to select between five and ten new astronauts. Nine of the USAF's eleven candidates were chosen as finalists, and one of those rejected, Joe Engle, was selected with NASA Astronaut Group 5 in 1966. Of the rest, thirteen were from the Navy, four were Marines, and six were civilians. Four had been finalists in the Mercury Seven selection: Pete Conrad, Jim Lovell, John Mitchell and Robert Solliday. Lovell had not been selected for the Mercury Seven due to a high bilirubin blood count.

The finalists were sent to Brooks Air Force Base in San Antonio for medical examinations. The tests there were much the same as those employed to select the Mercury Seven. One candidate was found to be  too tall. Another four were eliminated on the basis of ear, nose and throat examinations. The remaining 27 then went to Ellington Air Force Base near Houston, where the Manned Spacecraft Center (MSC) was being established. They were individually interviewed by the selection panel.

Nine candidates  were selected, and their names forwarded to Gilruth for approval. Slayton informed each of them by phone on September 14. The nine were Neil Armstrong, Frank Borman, Pete Conrad, Jim Lovell, James McDivitt, Elliot See, Tom Stafford, Ed White, and John Young. They arrived in Houston on September 15. To avoid tipping off the media, all checked into the Rice Hotel in Houston under the name of Max Peck, its general manager. On September 17, the media crowded into the 1800-seat Cullen Auditorium at the University of Houston for the official announcement, but it was a more low-key event than the unveiling of the Mercury Seven three years before.

As with those who had been passed over in the Mercury Seven selection, most of the rejected finalists went on to have distinguished careers. Three achieved flag rank: William E. Ramsey became a vice admiral in the Navy, William H. Fitch a lieutenant general in the Marine Corps and Kenneth Weir, a major general in the Marine Corps. Four would become NASA astronauts in later selections: Alan Bean, Michael Collins and Richard Gordon in 1963, and Jack Swigert in 1966. Francis G. Neubeck was selected as an astronaut for the Manned Orbiting Laboratory program, but never flew in space.

Demographics
Like the Mercury Seven, all of the Next Nine were male and white, and all were married, with an average of two children. Unlike the Mercury Seven, not all were Protestants; McDivitt was the first Roman Catholic chosen as an astronaut. Conrad, Lovell and Young were from the Navy; Borman, McDivitt, Stafford and White from the Air Force; and Armstrong and See were civilians, although both had previously served in the Navy.  All were test pilots, and Borman and McDivitt were also early graduates of the USAF Aerospace Research Pilot School (ARPS).

Their average age at the time of selection was 33 years and one month, compared to 34 years and ten months for the Mercury Seven when they were selected in April 1959. They had an average of 2,800 flying hours each, 1,900 of them in jets. This was 700 fewer flying hours than the Mercury Seven, but 200 more hours in jets. Their mean IQ was 132 on the Wechsler Adult Intelligence Scale. All had earned Bachelor of Science degrees. Three had Master of Science degrees in aeronautical engineering: Borman from the California Institute of Technology, See from the University of California at Los Angeles, and White from University of Michigan.

Group members

Assimilation 
The new astronauts became known as the Next Nine, or the New Nine. They moved to the Houston area in October 1962. Most of them bought lots and built houses in Nassau Bay, a new development to the east of the MSC. Conrad and Lovell built houses in Timber Cove, south of the MSC. Developers in Timber Cove and Nassau Bay offered astronauts mortgages with small down payments and low interest rates. The MSC complex was not yet complete, so NASA temporarily leased office space in Houston. Slayton's wife Marge and Borman's wife Susan organized an Astronauts' Wives Club along the lines of the Officers' Wives Clubs  that were a feature of military bases. As Slayton was in charge of astronaut activities, Marge was considered to be the equivalent of the commanding officer's wife. The nine were honored guests at Houston society parties, such as those thrown by socialite Joanne Herring, and their wives received $1,000 Neiman Marcus gift vouchers from an anonymous source.

A lawyer, Henry Batten, agreed to negotiate a deal with Field Enterprises for their personal stories, along the lines of the Life magazine deal enjoyed by the Mercury Seven, for no fee. As with the Life deal, there was some disquiet about the propriety of astronauts cashing in on government-created fame, but Mercury Seven astronaut John Glenn intervened, and personally raised the matter with Kennedy, who approved the deal. The deals with Field and Time-Life (which owned Life magazine) earned each of the Next Nine astronauts $16,250 per annum over the next four years, and provided them with $100,000 life insurance policies. Due to the dangerous nature of an astronaut's job, insurance companies would have charged them unaffordably high premiums.

Training  

Astronaut training was supervised by Raymond Zedehar, who reported to Warren North, the Director of Flight Crew Operations at the MSC. Initially, each of the astronauts was given four months' of classroom instruction on subjects such as spacecraft propulsion, orbital mechanics, astronomy, computing, and space medicine. Classes were for six hours a day, two days a week. There was also familiarization with the Gemini spacecraft, Titan II and Atlas boosters, and the Agena target vehicle. After classroom training was completed, there was a series of seminars on space science. The astronaut's lack of scientific training was recognized, but it was hoped that this would bring their knowledge up to a level where they could communicate with scientists. The first was delivered by Homer E. Newell Jr., NASA's Director of Space Sciences. Subsequent seminars covered topics such as the USAF's X-15 and X-20 Dyna-Soar programs, and the development of nuclear rocket engines. Geologist Eugene Shoemaker developed a training plan to teach the astronauts the fundamentals of selenology, the geology of the Moon. In January 1963 they went to Flagstaff, Arizona, where they studied the Meteor Crater and lava flows, and observed the Moon through the telescope at the Lowell Observatory.

In Zero-G training at Wright-Patterson Air Force Base in Ohio on May 20, 1963, each the Next Nine astronauts flew two flights in a reduced-gravity aircraft, a modified KC-135 Stratotanker aircraft. Each flight flew 20 parabolas that gave them between 20 and 30 seconds of weightlessness. Jungle survival training was conducted for all sixteen Mercury Seven and Next Nine astronauts at the  USAF Tropic Survival School at Albrook Air Force Station in Panama in June. This was the first time that the two groups had trained together. This was followed in August by desert survival training at Stead Air Force Base in Nevada, and field exercises at Carson Sink. In September, all sixteen were given instruction in parachute landings on land and water, but only the Next Nine attended the second phase of the program, water survival training on the Dilbert Dunker at the USN school at the Naval Air Station Pensacola in Florida and on Galveston Bay.

Following the precedent set by the Mercury Seven, each of the Next Nine was assigned a special area in which to develop expertise that could be shared with the others, and to provide astronaut input to designers and engineers. Armstrong was responsible for trainers and simulators; Borman for boosters, with special responsibility for abort systems; Conrad for cockpit layout, pilot controls and systems integration; Lovell for recovery systems, including the parachutes, paraglider and lunar module; McDivitt for guidance and navigation systems; See for electrical systems and coordination of mission planning; Stafford for communications systems, mission control and the ground support network; White for flight control systems, and Young for environmental control systems, survival gear, personal equipment and space suits.

Legacy 

Collins wrote that in his opinion "this group of nine was the best NASA ever picked, better than the seven that preceded it, or the fourteen, five, nineteen, eleven and seven that followed." Slayton felt so too, describing them as "probably the best all-round group ever put together." Looking over the tentative schedule of Apollo missions, Slayton calculated that up to 14 three-person crews might be required, but the 16 astronauts on hand could fill just five. Though he considered the schedule to be optimistic, he did not want a shortage of astronauts to be the reason the schedule could not be met, and he therefore proposed another round of recruiting. On June 5, 1963, NASA announced that it was seeking another ten to fifteen new astronauts.

The Next Nine went on to illustrious careers as astronauts. Apart from See and White, who were killed in a T-38 crash and in the Apollo fire, respectively, all went on to command Gemini and Apollo missions. Six of the nine flew to the Moon (Lovell and Young twice), and Armstrong, Conrad and Young walked on it as well. Seven of the nine received the Congressional Space Medal of Honor for their service, valor, and sacrifice:
 Armstrong, for commanding Apollo 11, the first lunar landing;
 Borman, for commanding Apollo 8, the first crewed mission to the Moon;
 Conrad, for commanding Skylab 2, and saving the damaged station;
 Lovell, for commanding the ill-fated Apollo 13;
 Stafford, for commanding the international Cold War Apollo-Soyuz Test Project;
 White, posthumously, killed in the Apollo 1 fire; and

Citations

General references

External links 
 

●
NASA Astronaut Corps